The Duke Of Cumberland is a Grade II listed public house at 235 New King's Road, Fulham, London.

It was built in 1892, and the architect was Robert J Cruwys.

It now trades as "The Duke on the Green", and is part of the Young's pub chain.

References

Pubs in the London Borough of Hammersmith and Fulham
Grade II listed buildings in the London Borough of Hammersmith and Fulham
Grade II listed pubs in London
Fulham